It Girl is the debut EP recorded by Canadian country music duo Petric. It was released October 16, 2015 through Steelhead Music. The collection includes the top 25 Canada Country hit "Here Goes Everything".

Background and release
In May 2015, Petric was announced as the first artist signed by Canadian singer Dallas Smith's then-new record label Steelhead Music. They released their debut single, "Here Goes Everything", on May 21, 2015 and it first impacted Canadian country radio on May 26, 2015. It Girl was released October 16, 2015 along with the single release of its title track. An acoustic version of the EP, titled It Girl (Stripped Down), was released December 9, 2016.

Promotion
The duo joined the western leg of Smith's Tippin' Point Tour in January and February 2015, where they began debuting the songs from It Girl. They held an album launch party at the Park Theatre in Winnipeg, Manitoba on November 25, 2015.

Critical reception
Amanda Hather of Canadian Beats rated the EP four-and-a-half stars out of five, writing, "the vocals and harmonies on this EP are very impressive and go to show how much talent the duo has."

Track listing

Charts

Singles

Release history

References

2015 debut EPs
Country music EPs
EPs by Canadian artists